Yevgeni Aleksandrovich Belonogov (born 19 April 1995) is a Russian football player.

Club career
He made his professional debut in the Russian Football National League for FC Luch-Energiya Vladivostok on 6 July 2014 in a game against FC SKA-Energiya Khabarovsk.

References

1995 births
Sportspeople from Vladivostok
Living people
Russian footballers
Association football midfielders
FC Luch Vladivostok players
FC Zenit-Izhevsk players